Douglas Cameron Main  (born July 18, 1946) is a Canadian broadcaster, communications consultant, political commentator and former Member of the Legislative Assembly of Alberta. He served as Cabinet Minister. He served as the news anchor for CITV (now Global Edmonton) from 1975 to 1988.

Broadcasting career
Main was a news anchor for CITV (now Global Edmonton) from 1975 to 1988. He left broadcasting to pursue a political career.

Political career
Main first ran as the Reform Party of Canada's candidate in Edmonton—Strathcona in the 1988 federal general election. He finished the race a very close third place in a field of ten candidates, losing to Progressive Conservative candidate Scott Thorkelson.

After being defeated in the federal election, Main was approached by the provincial Progressive Conservatives to run in the next Alberta election. He was elected in the constituency of Edmonton-Parkallen in the 1989 Alberta general election.

On April 14, 1989, Main was sworn in as Minister of Culture and Multiculturalism in the Cabinet of Premier Don Getty. He only served a single term in office, leaving at dissolution of the Assembly at the 1993 provincial general election after losing his nomination to run for the Progressive Conservatives again.

References

External links
Legislative Assembly of Alberta Members Listing

Living people
Politicians from Edmonton
Progressive Conservative Association of Alberta MLAs
Alberta candidates for Member of Parliament
Reform Party of Canada candidates in the 1988 Canadian federal election
Members of the Executive Council of Alberta
1946 births